Montiel is a municipality of Spain located in the province of Ciudad Real, Castilla–La Mancha. The municipality spans across a total area of 271.22 km2 and, as of 1 January 2020, it has a registered population of 1,294.

History 
On 5 March 1227, Ferdinand III donated the Estrella Castle to Pedro González, Grand Master of the Order of Santiago, so Montiel eventually became the head of the Campo de Montiel lands. In 1243, Montiel was granted a fuero (a copy of Cuenca's) and a number of privileges by Grand Master Paio Peres Correia.

The Battle of Montiel occurred at the town. It was also the place where Peter of Castile was killed by Henry of Trastamara.

References
Citations

Bibliography
 
 

Municipalities in the Province of Ciudad Real